Seasons of My Heart is an album by Kitty Wells that was released in 1960 on the Decca label (DL 4075). Thom Owens of Allmusic called the album "an excellent LP collection of country ballads."

Track listing
Side 1
 "Seasons of My Heart" (Darrell Edwards, George Jones) [2:39]
 "The Only One I Ever Loved I Lost" (Jack Anglin, Jim Anglin, Johnny Wright) [2:24]
 "Most of All" (Hank Thompson) [2:28]
 "Lonely Is a Word" (John D. Loudermilk) [2:00]
 "Fickle Fun" (Bill Anderson) [2:31]
 "The Hands You're Holding Now (Marty Robbins) [2:23]

Side 2
 "Send Me the Pillow You Dream On" (Hank Locklin) [2:36]
 "Amigo's Guitar" (John D. Loudermilk, Kitty Wells, Roy Bodkin) [2:36]
 "Let Me Help You Forget" (Jim Anglin) [2:40]
 "I'll Be All Smiles Tonight" (Kitty Wells) [2:58]
 "The Other Cheek" (Wayne P. Walker) [2:34]
 "If I Had the Right to Do You Wrong" (John D. Loudermilk) [2:42]

See also
 Kitty Wells albums discography

References

1960 albums
Kitty Wells albums